Ahascragh is a village in east Galway, Ireland. The R358 regional road passes through the village.

History
The patron saint of the village is Saint Cuan. His death is recorded in the Annals of the Four Masters in 788 A.D. St. Cuan's Well lies to the northeast. The Annals also mention the battle of Ahascragh in 1307 between the English forces and O'Kelly Chieftains.

Ahascragh had two Anglo-Irish seats of residence, located in Castlegar and Clonbrock, with respective period houses.
In Castlegar sat the Mahon family. The Mahons were settled at Castlegar from the late 17th century. They intermarried on a number of occasions with members of the Browne family of Westport. In 1819 the head of the family became a baronet. In the 1830s, at the time of the first Ordnance Survey, Ross Mahon was the proprietor of several townlands in the parish of Ahascragh. The Mahon estate was one of the principal lessors in the parish of Grange, barony of Loughrea at the time of Griffith's Valuation. Mr. Charles Filgate acted as agent for this property. The Mahons also held extensive lands in the baronies of Clonmacnowen and Killian. In the 1870s the Castlegar estate amounted to over 32 km2 (8,000 acres) in county Galway as well as over 3.2 km2 (800 acres) in the parish of Termonbarry, barony of Ballintober North, county Roscommon. In 1906 Sir William Mahon held over 4.9 km2 (1,200 acres) of untenanted land in the Ahascragh area. MacLochlainn writes that most of the estate was sold to the Land Commission in 1977.

In 1979 the house was sold by the Mahons to John Horan, who advertised the house for sale again in 1988. There is still a house at this site.

In Clonbrock sat the Dillon family.  Lord Clonbrock was listed as a resident proprietor in county Galway in 1824. At the time of Griffith's Valuation, Lord Clonbrock was one of the principal lessors in the parishes of Ahascragh, Fohanagh, Killalaghtan and Killosolan in the barony of Kilconnell and Killoran in the barony of Longford. In the 1870s the Clonbrock estate in county Galway amounted to over 110 km2 (28,000 acres). Lands, house and demesne at Cahir, barony of Clonmacnowen, owned by James Dillon, were offered for sale in the Encumbered Estates court in July 1854. In 1906 Lord Clonbrock held over 8.1 km2 (2,000 acres) of untenanted land and the mansion house at Clonbrock.

Today
Still a small village, the community is served by five pubs: Katie Daly's (originally built as a thatched cottage), Cahills, Clinton's, O’Donnell's and DeCourcy's. There are also several hairdressers, two undertakers and one auctioneer located in the village. There is a Londis shop and petrol pumps. There is one large supplier of general goods. There is also a National (Primary) School in Ahascragh.

Fishing
The fishing season on the Bunowen River is between March and September. Species in the river include Wild Brown Trout. The local fishery is part of the Shannon Regional Fisheries Board's 'Midland Fisheries Group' of controlled waters and anglers require a fishing permit (ticket charge) to fish here.

Popular culture
RTÉ's award-winning show Don't Feed the Gondolas presented by Sean Moncrieff, satirised small village Ireland at the end of each show, choosing Ahascragh and the fictional "Head of the Parish Co-mit-tea" Monica Loolly as its instrument. The following footnotes will bring you to a site playing a Monica Loolly call and secondly pictures from the show.

People
Philip Treacy, OBE. Born and raised on Church Street, Treacy is a leading milliner based in London.
Mairtín Byrnes (deceased). An award-winning Irish fiddle player of the East Galway style, who is on the list of all-Ireland Fleadh champions, 1970.
Seán 'ac Donncha (deceased). An award-winning Irish singer who was the headmaster for many years in Ahascragh national school.
Eamon Gilmore. Born in the parish of Ahascragh, in the village of Caltra, Gilmore was leader of the Labour Party and Tánaiste
Mary Harney. Born into a farming family in the Ahascragh locality, Harney became leader of the Progressive Democrats and a government minister holding various portfolios, including that of Tánaiste (Deputy Prime Minister).
Rónán Mullen. A university panel member of Seanad Éireann, Mullen is an independent politician. 
Fr. Kevin Reynolds. A priest subjected to a defamation by Raidió Teilifís Éireann (RTÉ) in Mission to Prey.

Annalistic references

 788 - Cuan of Ath Eascrach ... died.
 1307 - The greater number of the English of Roscommon were slain by Donough Muimhneach O'Kelly, Lord of Hy-Many, at Ath-easgrach-Cuan, where Philip Muinder, John Muinder, and Main Drew, with many others whose names are not mentioned, were killed. Dermot Gall Mac Dermot, Cormac Mac Kaherny, and the sheriff of Roscommon, were taken prisoners; but they were afterwards set at liberty, and they made peace recte restitution for the burning of the town by Edmund Butler. Donough O'Kelly, after he had performed these exploits, died; and his was not the death of one who had lived a life of cowardice, but the death of a man who had displayed prowess and bravery, and bestowed jewels and riches.

See also
List of towns and villages in Ireland

References

External links
Ahascragh at Ireland West
Pictures of the village and some of its residents

Towns and villages in County Galway